Sheila Harvey is a Scottish curler.

She is a two-time World women's silver medallist.

Teams

References

External links

Living people
Scottish female curlers
Scottish curling champions
Year of birth missing (living people)